Brachyramphus  is a small genus of  seabirds from the North Pacific. Brachyramphus is from Ancient Greek brakhus, "short", and  rhamphos, "bill". In English the species are named as "murrelets"; this is a diminutive of "murre", a word of uncertain origins, but which may imitate the call of the common guillemot.

Taxonomy
The genus Brachyramphus was introduced in 1837 by the German born naturalist Johann Friedrich von Brandt. The type genus was subsequently designated by George Robert Gray as the marbled murrelet. The genus name combines Ancient Greek  meaning "short" with  meaning "bill".

The genus contains three species:

These are unusual members of the auk family, often nesting far inland in forests or on mountain tops. The long-billed murrelet was considered conspecific with the marbled murrelet until 1998, when Friesen et al. showed that the mtDNA variation was greater between these two forms than between marbled and Kittlitz's murrelets.

These species breed in the subarctic North Pacific. They tend to remain coastal in winter, either staying near the breeding grounds, or, in the case of long-billed, migrating to the coast of Japan.

Two prehistoric species have been described from Late Pliocene fossils, found in the San Diego Formation of the southwestern US: Brachyramphus dunkeli Chandler, 1990 and Brachyramphus pliocenus Howard, 1949

Description
These are small chunky auks, no more than 25 cm long. Like other auks, they have plumage that varies by season. The non-breeding appearance is typically white underneath with mainly black upperparts. The breeding plumage is distinctive in this group; most auks are strongly contrasted with black and white when breeding, but Brachyramphus species are mainly brown, with pale feather edges giving a scaly appearance; the central underparts, normally below the surface on a swimming bird, are white.

Behaviour and breeding
Murrelets feed at sea on small fish, larval fish, krill and other small zooplankton. Chicks are fed with larger fish carried in the bill.

The breeding behaviour of this genus is very unusual. Unlike most other seabirds, they do not breed in colonies or even necessarily close to the sea, instead nesting, depending on species, on branches of old-growth conifers, mountaintops, or on open ground. They lay one egg on bare ground or on a thick lichen- or moss-covered branch or hollow. The egg is incubated for a month, then the chick is fed for around 40 days until it fledges and flies unaccompanied to the sea. Breeding success is low and chick mortality high.

Threats
All three Brachyramphus  murrelets are globally threatened and declining in numbers. The biggest threat are the loss of nesting habitat, due to the loss of old growth forest to logging and retreating, entanglement in (plastic) fishing gear and oil spills.

References

Further reading

 Maumary, Lionel and Peter Knaus (2000) Marbled Murrelet in Switzerland: a Pacific Ocean auk new to the Western Palearctic  British Birds 93:190-199 (this article on Europe's first Long-billed Murrelet was published when the species was regarded as conspecific with Marbled Murrelet; the latter species has not occurred in Europe)

 
Auks
Bird genera